"Where I Belong" is a song recorded by American country music artist Rachel Proctor.  It was released in September 2004 as the fourth single and title track from the album Where I Belong.  The song reached #37 on the Billboard Hot Country Singles & Tracks chart.  The song was written by Troy Verges, Aimee Mayo, Chris Lindsey and Hillary Lindsey.

Chart performance

References

2004 singles
2004 songs
Rachel Proctor songs
Songs written by Chris Lindsey
Songs written by Hillary Lindsey
Songs written by Aimee Mayo
Songs written by Troy Verges
Song recordings produced by Chris Lindsey
BNA Records singles